

Events
The Italian Calega Panzan composes , a sirventes attacking the Guelphs and Angevins
Raimon Gaucelm de Bezers composes , a canso about Louis IX of France and his preparations for the Eighth Crusade
Paulet de Marselha composes , a planh on the death of Barral des Baux
Manuscript "V", one of the earliest preserved chansonniers, is compiled in Catalonia. Now in the Biblioteca Marciana, Venice, fr. App. cod. XI.

Births

Deaths

13th-century poetry
Poetry